Matthes Glacier is a glacier  long, flowing east into Whirlwind Inlet between Demorest Glacier and Chamberlin Glacier, on the east coast of Graham Land, Antarctica. It was discovered by Sir Hubert Wilkins on a flight of December 20, 1928, and photographed from the air by the United States Antarctic Service in 1940. It was charted by the Falkland Islands Dependencies Survey in 1947 and named for François E. Matthes, then chief geologist with the U.S. Geological Survey.

See also
Werenskiold Bastion

References

Glaciers of Graham Land
Bowman Coast